Vanessa Boslak (born 11 June 1982) is a French pole vaulter.  She was born in Lesquin, France.

Boslak represented her country in major international competitions such as the Olympic Games, World Championships, World Indoor Championships, European Championships and European Indoor Championships.

Boslak's personal outdoor best is 4.70 metres, achieved at the 2006 European Cup in Málaga on 28 June 2006 and in the pole vault final of the 2007 World Championships in Osaka on 28 August 2007. She achieved her personal indoor best of 4.70m in winning the silver medal on 11 March 2012  at the 2012 World Indoor Championships in Istanbul.

International competition record
Note: Only the position and height in the final are indicated, unless otherwise stated. (q) means the athlete did not qualify for the final, with the overall position and height in the qualification round indicated.

References

Vanessa Boslak at Sports-Reference

1982 births
Living people
French female pole vaulters
Athletes (track and field) at the 2004 Summer Olympics
Athletes (track and field) at the 2008 Summer Olympics
Athletes (track and field) at the 2012 Summer Olympics
Athletes (track and field) at the 2016 Summer Olympics
Olympic athletes of France
Mediterranean Games gold medalists for France
Mediterranean Games medalists in athletics
Athletes (track and field) at the 2005 Mediterranean Games
People from Lesquin
Sportspeople from Nord (French department)